The 2010–11 Memphis Tigers men's basketball team represented the University of Memphis in the 2010–11 college basketball season, the 90th season of Tiger basketball. The Tigers were coached by head coach Josh Pastner (assisted by Glynn Cyprien, Jack Murphy, and Willis Wilson), and played their home games at the FedExForum in Memphis, Tennessee. They are members of Conference USA. They finished the season 25–10, 10–6 in C-USA play and won the 2011 Conference USA men's basketball tournament to earn an automatic bid in the 2011 NCAA Division I men's basketball tournament where they lost in the second round to Arizona.

Pre-season
The 2009–10 Memphis Tigers finished the season with a record of 24–10 (13–3 C-USA). The Tigers finished in second place in C-USA, but were upset in the quarterfinals of the conference tournament by 7 seed and ultimate champion, Houston. For the first time since 2005, the Tigers did not earn a bid to the NCAA tournament. The Tigers accepted an invitation to the 2010 National Invitation Tournament, beating St. John's before being defeated by Ole Miss in the second round.

The Tigers signed a number of highly rated recruits before the 2010–2011 season began, including three native Memphians: Tarik Black of Ridgeway High School, Joe Jackson of White Station High School, and Chris Crawford of Sheffield High School. The incoming freshman class of 2010 also included Will Barton and his brother, Antonio Barton, Jelan Kendrick, and Hippolyte Tsafack. The signing class, which included three All-Americans (Jackson, Will Barton, Kendrick), was rated the country's second best.

Departures

Statistics accurate as of 29 March 2010.

Recruiting

Transfers

Season summary
The Tigers began the 2010–2011 season ranked 19th in the AP Poll and the pre-season favorite to win the Conference USA championship. Prior to the team's first regular season game with Centenary, Jelan Kendrick was suspended. After the game, Kendrick asked for permission to seek a transfer and was released.

The team announced on December 10, 2010 that junior forward Wesley Witherspoon would be out a number of weeks as a result of knee surgery.  On December 12, 2010, junior forward Angel Garcia left the Tigers to play professionally in Spain.

Highlights of the regular season included wins over pre-season No. 12 Gonzaga and two victories each against both Southern Miss and UAB. However, beset by injuries, transfers, suspensions, and inconsistent play from their heralded freshmen and upperclassmen, the Tigers underachieved relative to their pre-season expectations during a majority of their regular season schedule.  The Tigers suffered their worst margin of defeat in the FedEx Forum in several years in their loss to then No. 10 Georgetown on December 23, 2010 by a score of 69–86.  The Tigers also lost at Rice, SMU, and East Carolina during their Conference USA schedule.

The Tigers entered the 2011 Conference USA men's basketball tournament as the 4 seed with a 22–9 overall record and 10–6 record in conference. Tournament MVP Joe Jackson led the Tigers to the tournament championship, defeating 5 seed Southern Miss, 8 seed East Carolina, and 3 seed UTEP, which was playing at home, for the conference crown. Jackson sealed the victory against UTEP in the championship game in dramatic fashion, scoring the final two of his 17 points on two free throws with 7.8 seconds remaining, causing the Tigers to take their first lead of the game.

The Tigers earned a 12 seed in the 2011 NCAA tournament, where they were defeated by 5th seeded Arizona Wildcats on Friday March 18, 2011 in Tulsa, Oklahoma by a score of 77–75.

Roster

Schedule

|-
!colspan=9 style=| Exhibition

|-
!colspan=9 style=| Regular Season

|-
!colspan=9 style=| Conference USA Tournament

|-
!colspan=9 style=| NCAA Tournament

Notes

Memphis Tigers men's basketball seasons
Memphis Tigers Men's Basketball Team, 2010-11
Memphis
Memphis Tigers men's basketball
Memphis Tigers men's basketball